Twenty One Pilots (stylized in all lowercase, twenty øne piløts or twenty | one | pilots) is an American musical duo from Columbus, Ohio. Initially a band, the group was formed in 2009 by lead vocalist Tyler Joseph along with Nick Thomas and Chris Salih, who both left in 2011. Since their departure, the line-up has consisted of Joseph and drummer Josh Dun. The duo is best known for their singles "Stressed Out", "Ride", and "Heathens". The group received a Grammy Award for Best Pop Duo/Group Performance at the 59th Annual Grammy Awards for "Stressed Out". The band independently released two albums, Twenty One Pilots (2009) and Regional at Best (2011), before being signed by record label Fueled by Ramen in 2012. Their label debut, Vessel, was released in 2013 and became the second album in history on which every track received at least a gold certification, making Twenty One Pilots the first band in the history of music to see every song on two albums earn gold or platinum awards.

The duo achieved breakthrough success with their fourth album, Blurryface (2015), which produced the successful singles "Stressed Out" and "Ride" and became the first album on which every track received at least a gold certification from the Recording Industry Association of America. The release of the single "Heathens" also made the group the first alternative artist in history to have two concurrent top five singles in the Billboard Hot 100 and the third rock act in history to have two singles simultaneously chart in the top five of the Billboard Hot 100, joining the Beatles and Elvis Presley.

The duo have released six studio albums in total, with the latest being Scaled and Icy, released on May 21, 2021. They have also garnered ten No. 1 songs on the Alternative Songs chart, making them the artist with the fourth-most number-one songs on the chart, just below Linkin Park.

History

2009–2011: Formation and self-titled album

Tyler Joseph first met future bandmate Nick Thomas at a young age while playing youth basketball in Columbus, Ohio. Thomas later transferred to Joseph's middle school, and the two would remain friends throughout high school.

Joseph began playing music after finding an old keyboard inside his closet, a Christmas gift he received from his mother, and began mimicking radio melodies. In 2007, Joseph released a solo EP, No Phun Intended, in his parents' basement. Thomas contributed guitar to several songs on the album, and collaborated with Joseph on the track "Trees", which would later become a signature song for the band.

While attending Ohio State University, Joseph met Texas-born future bandmate Chris Salih at a party. Noting the songwriter's talent and creative energy, Salih consulted Joseph about starting a band. Impressed by the recording studio Salih had built in his house, Joseph agreed to play music together and began sharing his ideas for new music. Just before their first performance, Joseph invited Thomas to join the unnamed band as a bassist. In 2009, the group moved into a house of their own, where their first album was conceptualized and recorded in the basement.

The band initially played for a wide variety of audiences at clubs and venues around the Columbus area. Playing at metal, hardcore, and electronic venues influenced Joseph to incorporate these disparate styles into his songwriting. To catch the attention of unfamiliar or disinterested attendees and promoters, the band began to experiment with costumes and on-stage acrobatics.

Now going by the name Twenty One Pilots, the group released their debut, self-titled album, Twenty One Pilots, on December 29, 2009, and began touring Ohio. Their initial marketing was grassroots; Joseph's mother would stand outside of Ohio State University, giving away tickets to their shows. During this time, the band participated in various "Battle of the Band" contests at The Alrosa Villa and The Basement, important Columbus music venues.

In 2010, the band posted two tracks to their SoundCloud account, a cover of "Jar of Hearts" by Christina Perri and "Time to Say Goodbye", an original song that samples "Con te partirò" by Andrea Bocelli and Sarah Brightman. The latter track would become the first song that local drummer Josh Dun heard from the group.

Joseph, Dun, and Salih participated in musical efforts of a Columbus, Ohio, church Five14. They contributed to four of fourteen tracks for their album Clear, with Travis Whittaker and the gospel rock band "New Albany Music." In 2011, Joseph appeared in a three-part video called "The (moderately inspiring tale of the) Longboard Rodeo Tango", and sang "O come, O come, Emmanuel" in another video, Christmas With the Stars.

2011–2012: Lineup changes and Regional at Best

Salih left on May 8, 2011 to focus on work, and Thomas left the next month on June 3, 2011 to focus on schooling, both posting farewell notes on the band's official Facebook page. Before departing from the project, Salih invited Guitar Center co-worker and friend of the group Josh Dun (former touring drummer for House of Heroes), to take his place in the band. Impressed by the band's potential and Joseph's creative vision, Dun abandoned plans to pursue drumming in Nashville and joined the project only a few weeks before Thomas left the group.

Both Salih and Thomas remained involved with the band's production for some time after their departure. Thomas briefly attended school in North Carolina, but moved back into Joseph and Dun's house in Columbus a year later and began to manage their merchandise. Thomas remained a part of the merchandise distribution crew throughout the production of Blurryface and continues to stay actively involved in the band's tour cycle.

With a new lineup consisting of only Joseph and Dun, Twenty One Pilots self-released their second album, Regional at Best, on July 8, 2011. The album was accompanied by a free CD release show on the grounds of New Albany High School. While Salih and Thomas were involved with the conceptualization of the album, neither they nor Dun claim to have had much involvement with its production, which was handled nearly exclusively by Joseph. The album features Joseph's brother Zack on the track "Kitchen Sink" and Joseph's college acquaintance Jocef on the track "Be Concerned".

In November 2011, after months of cultivating a fan base in the Columbus area via social media interaction and constant touring, the band played a sold-out concert at Columbus' Newport Music Hall. This caught the attention of several record labels interested in seeing if the band's appeal could stretch outside of Ohio. That same year, the duo put out two free songs via their email newsletter: the original version of "House of Gold" and "Two".

Joseph and Dun embarked on the Regional at Best Tour with rock band CHALLENGER!, documenting it in a series of videos uploaded to the Twenty One Pilots YouTube channel.

2012–2014: Major label signing and Vessel

In April 2012, the band announced their signing to Atlantic Records subsidiary Fueled by Ramen during a show at the Lifestyle Communities Pavilion. On July 17, 2012, they released their debut Fueled by Ramen recording, an EP entitled Three Songs. The next month, the band embarked on a short tour with Neon Trees and Walk the Moon.

Tyler Joseph successfully negotiated to maintain ownership of the preceding self-titled album, which remains available digitally. However, as part of a signing agreement in 2012 with record label Fueled by Ramen, rights to Regional at Best were transferred to the label, meaning that Regional at Best was discontinued and removed from digital markets. Regional at Best tracks "Slowtown", "Anathema", "Ruby", "Be Concerned", and "Clear" have since been made commercially unavailable.

On November 12, 2012, the official music video for "Holding on to You", directed by Jordan Bahat, was released on YouTube. On January 7 and April 19, 2013, the band released music videos for "Guns for Hands" and "Car Radio", respectively, both directed by Mark Eshleman of Reel Bear Media.

In an interview with the Huffington Post, Joseph described Regional at Best as a "glorified mixtape" and confirmed that songs from that project would reappear on their major label debut studio album. Ultimately, five tracks from Regional at Best – "Guns for Hands", "Holding on to You", "Ode to Sleep", "Car Radio", and "Trees" – were re-recorded and released for their third album. "Lovely" was also re-recorded and released as a single in Japan on April 17, 2013. "Glowing Eyes", "Kitchen Sink", and "Forest" appeared unchanged as bonus tracks on the UK version of Vessel.

Twenty One Pilots' third album, Vessel, was released January 8, 2013; it would reach No. 21 on the Billboard 200, No. 9 on the Digital Albums chart, No. 17 on the Internet Albums chart, No. 15 on the Rock Albums Chart, and No. 10 on the Alternative Albums Chart. The band's first charting single, "Holding on to You", reached No. 11 on the Billboard Alternative Songs chart. Additionally, the singles "Guns for Hands" and "Lovely" reached No. 21 and No. 67, respectively, on the Japan Hot 100.

In 2013, Twenty One Pilots (along with Panic! at the Disco) were one of the opening acts for Fall Out Boy on their Save Rock and Roll Arena Tour. On August 8, 2013, Twenty One Pilots performed "House of Gold" on Conan in their late night debut. On October 2, the music video for the song was uploaded onto YouTube.

On March 17, 2014, Twenty One Pilots performed a set at the MTVU Woodie Awards during SXSW. On April 13, Twenty One Pilots performed "Car Radio" at the 2014 MTV Movie Awards. On April 28, the band performed "Car Radio" on Late Night with Seth Meyers.

In 2014, Twenty One Pilots played a number of music festivals and other events around the United States, such as Lollapalooza, Bonnaroo, Boston Calling, and Firefly. Requests from many of these cities were incorporated into the band's first headlining tour, the Quiet Is Violent World Tour, which began in September 2014 and ended in November of the same year.

On December 31, 2014, the band released a music video for the song "Ode to Sleep". Composed of footage captured by band creative director Mark Eshleman from three concerts over the preceding three years, the video depicted the band's growth from their origins as a small local band to a nationally popular alternative act.

2015–2017: Blurryface

On March 16, 2015, the band announced that a new album, Blurryface, was to be released on May 19. They released the first single, "Fairly Local", on March 17. Their second single of the album, "Tear in My Heart", and its music video were released on April 5, 2015. On April 28, "Stressed Out", the third song released from the album, was released along with a music video. "Stressed Out" became the group's best-selling single, peaking at No. 2 on the U.S. Billboard Hot 100, and No. 1 on both Alternative Songs and Hot Rock Songs charts, while also surpassing over 2.5 billion views on YouTube.

Blurryface was released two days early on May 17, 2015 and sold 134,000 copies in the first week in the U.S. which made it the band's first No. 1 album on the Billboard 200. On May 22, 2016, Blurryface won in the category of "Top Rock Album" at the Billboard Music Awards, while the band won the category of "Top Rock Artist".

The band began the Blurryface Tour on May 11, 2015, in Glasgow, Scotland. The tour spanned the United States, Australia, Asia, and Europe. The U.S. leg began September 8, 2015 and featured Echosmith and Finish Ticket as openers. Twenty One Pilots performed "Stressed Out" on Late Night with Seth Meyers on September 14, 2015. The band announced a London show in February 2016, and later announced a run of UK dates, with a second London date added. The band Transviolet served as openers. This run of UK dates ended the initial Blurryface Tour.

A second tour for the Blurryface album, the Emotional Roadshow World Tour, started in Cincinnati on May 31, 2016. The tour covered the United States, Canada, Mexico, Europe, and Australia. Chef'Special and Mutemath opened for the American leg. Irish singer Bry joined the tour for its European leg.

On June 16, 2016, the band released the song "Heathens" as the first single from the Suicide Squad soundtrack, earlier than the expected release date of June 24, after the song leaked onto the internet on June 15. A music video for the song was released on June 21, 2016. "Heathens" plays during the ending credits of the film.

In September 2016, the band contributed a cover of the piano ballad "Cancer" by My Chemical Romance to the tribute album Rock Sound Presents: The Black Parade. An animated lyric video followed the release of the song.

Twenty One Pilots featured as the musical guest on Saturday Night Live on October 8, 2016, performing orchestra-accompanied versions of "Heathens" and "Ride". The band later performed a medley of "Heathens" and "Stressed Out" on the American Music Awards of 2016, where they also accepted their first awards on American television for Favorite Pop/Rock Duo and Favorite Alternative Rock Artist. On November 25, 2016, the band released a limited-edition live vinyl album documenting two performances at Fox Oakland Theatre, on the duo's 2015 Blurryface Tour under the name Blurryface Live.

Joseph and Dun collaborated with alternative rock band Mutemath, for a five-song EP, TOPxMM, composed of remixes and re-imaginings of four tracks from Blurryface as well as "Heathens". The EP was uploaded onto the band's official website free of charge on December 19; a 25-minute long video of the bands recording the songs live in studio was also released on the band's YouTube channel.

On February 12, 2017, Twenty One Pilots won a Grammy Award for "Stressed Out" in the Best Pop Duo/Group Performance category. The band stripped to their underwear before taking the stage, with Joseph claiming in their acceptance speech that this was a fulfillment of a promise the duo had made each other in their early days as a local Columbus band.

On March 27, 2017, the band began selling tickets for Tour De Columbus, a five-date hometown tour taking place in June 2017. The duo performed at several small venues they first played as a local band including The Basement, Newport Music Hall, and Express Live!, before ending their tour cycle with arena shows at Nationwide Arena and Value City Arena.

In an interview with Alternative Press in November 2016, Twenty One Pilots stated that after their last show for Blurryface, they will be "going dark" to focus on new music. Joseph stated that he would like to focus on lyrical content of the music, and bring the music back to the "authenticity, lyrics, delivery, and fearlessness of songwriting" similar to that of their self-titled debut album. The band's last activity came in July 2017 in the form of posts on social media depicting an eye closing over lyrics from several of their songs.

In March 2018, their song "Hometown" received a gold certification from the RIAA, making Blurryface the first full-length album to have every track achieve at least gold certification.

2018–2020: Trench

In April 2018, a cryptic message was uncovered on the band's web store, which revealed a website. Fans began using clues and found other sections of this site, hinting at the possibility of the band's return. There were multiple images uploaded to the website, including letters from a character named "Clancy". In July 2018, Twenty One Pilots broke their year-long silence, first sending a cryptic email to fans and later posting a video to all social media platforms and updating their logo and branding. Tyler Joseph made his first media appearance in over a year for an interview with Zane Lowe of Beats 1 from his home studio in Columbus, Ohio, in which he spoke about the band's year long hiatus, creating the new album, and battling against personal demons and insecurities.

On July 11, 2018, the band released two new songs, "Jumpsuit" and "Nico and the Niners", as well as the music video for "Jumpsuit". Later, on July 26, 2018, the music video for "Nico and the Niners" was released. The song "Levitate" was subsequently released as the album's third single via Zane Lowe's Beats 1 show as the day's "World Record". The music video was also released, concluding the trilogy series.

On August 20, 2018, at the MTV VMAs, a ten second long snippet of the song "My Blood" was played at the end of a commercial promoting the album. On August 27, 2018, the band made "My Blood" available on streaming services as the album's fourth official single. The band released their fifth album, Trench, on October 5, 2018. On the same day, they released the music video for their single "My Blood". Trench debuted at number two on the Billboard 200, and number one on the Billboard Top Rock Albums and Alternative Albums charts. All fourteen tracks from the album charted in the top 25 of the Hot Rock Songs chart, where five tracks were in the top 10.

On September 12, 2018, Twenty One Pilots played their first live show in over a year, titled A Complete Diversion, at O2 Brixton Academy in London. They performed the four released songs from Trench, as well as some songs from their previous albums, to promote the album and the upcoming The Bandito Tour. Twenty One Pilots performed their single "Jumpsuit" at the 2018 American Music Awards on October 9, at the Microsoft Theatre in Los Angeles. On November 1, the band performed stripped-down versions of "My Blood" and "Ride", as well as covering Damien Rice's "9 Crimes", in BBC Radio 1's Live Lounge. Radio 1 visited the band in their hometown and filmed the session at the Newport Music Hall in Columbus, Ohio, for the kickoff of the Live Lounge Month, a month-long series of performances from different artists.

On October 16, the band embarked on the worldwide The Bandito Tour, starting in the U.S. and continuing with legs in Oceania and Europe. They also announced additional 2019 tour dates for shows in Canada, Mexico and the U.S. The band's stunts during the set included leaping, backflipping, vertical crowd-surfing, suspended bridge walking, and scaffolding scaling.

On January 22, 2019, the music video for "Chlorine" was unveiled upon the song's release as a single and was directed by Mark C. Eshleman of Reel Bear Media, featuring an alien-like creature named "Ned". The band headlined a number of festivals in the summer of 2019, including Reading and Leeds and Lollapalooza.

On June 19, 2019, a re-imagined version of "Chlorine", titled "Chlorine (19.4326° N, 99.1332° W)", was released. It was the first song to be released from the Løcatiøn Sessiøns. Other songs in the series included "Ride", "Smithereens", "My Blood" and "Cut My Lip". In 2019, Nationwide Boulevard in Columbus, Ohio was temporarily renamed to Twenty One Pilots Boulevard to celebrate two hometown shows at the Nationwide Arena in Columbus, where the band also opened up a pop-up shop named "Ned's Bayou".

On July 16, 2019, "The Hype" was sent to US alternative radio as the sixth and final single from Trench.

2021–present: Scaled and Icy 

On March 4, 2019, five months after the release of their fifth studio album Trench, the band confirmed that they were working on their next studio album. About the possible theme, Joseph said, "there's a character that hasn't been talked about on any record yet that plays a huge role in the narrative that obviously will need to be talked about and it's probably where we're going next". On April 9, 2020, the duo released the song "Level of Concern", which marked the first musical output by the duo since the release of Trench. "Level of Concern" references COVID-19 pandemic-induced anxiety, and its accompanying music video was filmed in Joseph and Dun's homes while they were under lockdown due to the pandemic. Joseph directed a portion of the song's proceeds to Crew Nation, a charity for live music crews who could not be paid during the international quarantine.

In November 2020, Dun revealed that they were still working "remotely" on the album, with both members being in different locations. He described the recording process: "we both have our own studios, which is really nice, so he comes up with a lot of stuff at his studio, sends it over to me, and then I come up with some stuff here at my studio and then send it back". On December 8, 2020, the band released a Christmas single, "Christmas Saves the Year", following a Twitch stream by Joseph.

The duo's sixth studio album, Scaled and Icy, was released on May 21, 2021. The album's name is an anagram, which spells out "Clancy is dead", and is a play on the phrase "scaled back and isolated", penned by Joseph. The album was first teased on April 6, 2021 through dmaorg.info—a website the band uses to share lore—via a poster including the text "New Album and Livestream Experience". The album was officially announced by the band a day later. The album's lead single "Shy Away" was released the same day, along with a music video. The second single from the album, "Choker", was released on April 30, 2021, alongside a music video. The third single from the album, "Saturday", was released on May 18, 2021.

The band announced a concert livestream two days before the release of the lead single "Shy Away", which occurred on May 21, 2021, coinciding with the album's release. The livestream, described as being "career-spanning", included live performances of songs from Scaled and Icy, as well as previous records. Buying a ticket to the livestream provided fans a six-week pre-show experience with exclusive access to merchandise and album variants. In a promotional video, Dun compared the pre-show access to the experience of queuing with other fans before a concert begins. The performance was staged live in Value City Arena, featuring multiple sets, costumes, and dancers, and also introduced a new live touring band that would join the duo for future shows. On May 19, 2022, the band released an extended cut of the performance with behind-the-scenes footage in over 1,000 theaters worldwide, though it has still yet to receive a home release.

On June 16, 2021, the duo announced the Takeover Tour, during which they would spend one full week in each city they visited, performing at small clubs as well as large venues. The tour began in Denver, Colorado in September 2021. On July 23, 2021, the artists Half Alive, Arrested Youth and Jay Joseph were announced as openers for the U.S. leg of the tour. The Icy Tour, a re-branded second leg of the Takeover Tour focusing on arena shows, began in August 2022 and concluded in September. For the first time since the band became a duo almost a decade before, these tours featured a dedicated band of live musicians, though their shows continued to make some use of backing tracks.

On July 8, 2021, little over a month after the release of Scaled and Icy, the duo released a music video for the song "Saturday". On September 17, 2021, the duo held a virtual concert in the online video game Roblox.

On November 19, 2021, the duo released Scaled and Icy (Livestream Version), which features all of the songs from the livestream concert and "Level of Concern". On December 8, 2021, one year after its initial release, the duo released a music video for the song "Christmas Saves the Year", which utilizes claymation. "The Outside" was issued as the album's fourth and final single on November 24, 2021, followed by a music video on March 18, 2022. On June 9, 2022, the duo performed new versions of several songs, both old and new, on MTV Unplugged.

On July 22, 2022, the duo released a live performance video in collaboration with the Netflix series Stranger Things, in which they performed a mashup of the show's theme song and their 2016 single "Heathens".

On January 8, 2023, the duo's album Vessel was re-released as a limited edition vinyl boxset. The vinyl was packaged in a metallic silhouetted cover box, included a poster and polaroid collection, and featured bonus tracks. The release was accompanied by a YouTube variety stream celebrating the record's 10th anniversary; the livestream was a partnership and fundraiser for the non-profit Make-A-Wish Foundation where the band raised over $47,000. The vinyl release was met with sales of an all-time high and an unprecedented demand; delivery of all pre-orders had been expected to be as early as February 3, 2023.

Artistry

The duo grew up in strict Christian households where they had to either conceal their pop punk and hip hop albums from the censure of their parents, or find faith-friendly counterparts. Both still identify as Christians. According to Dun, "I'd hide albums like Green Day's Dookie under my bed. They'd find a Christian alternative, like Relient K, and make me listen to that." However, his parents eventually relaxed on rock music, even allowing Dun to assemble a live drum kit in their basement. Joseph's very first favorite band was the Christian rap rock trio DC Talk. He taught himself the piano by playing along to songs on the radio by artists like the Beatles and Celine Dion.

Musical style

The band's musical style has been described as alternative hip hop, electropop, indie pop, pop rock, rap rock, alternative rock, rock, synth-pop, pop, electronica, electronic rock, indie rock, hip hop, and indietronica with reggae, folk, psychedelic, new wave, and funk influences. Because their music contains a mix of many genres, the duo has been difficult to categorize. In response to criticism of their style as trying to be "all things to everyone", Joseph responded, "I'm not trying to be that. I'm being what I want to be for myself." Dun elaborates one of their goals as musicians was to tear down the walls of musical genres and combine different aspects. Joseph said he prefers to be surprised by unpredictable music.

The duo are most frequently categorized as alternative hip hop, a subgenre of hip hop known for its unconventional nature and blending of music styles that is embraced primarily by alternative rock listeners and college radio moreso than rap or pop audiences. They create music borrowing from a wide variety of different genres, most often hip hop, electropop, punk, rock, and reggae. Their songs contain a mixture of musical styles, intertwining rap rock rhymes laced with hard rock energy and piano pop hooks over synth-pop beats and reggae rhythms. Early material is post-emo, following bands such as My Chemical Romance and Dashboard Confessional, with show tune or glam rock esthetics. At the time of their major-label debut album Vessel, Twenty One Pilots was described as an indie rock duo. The album featured a fusion of rap, piano pop, rock and electronica. Their breakthrough album Blurryface expressed elements of pop, EDM, breakbeat, reggae, and dancehall. Over time, hip hop has become an increasingly prominent musical influence for the band. Twenty One Pilots has since been hailed as a leading contemporary alternative rock group, having sent four singles to the summit of the hot rock charts, and ten to the top of the alternative charts, with most of their singles reaching at least the top ten as well.

Twenty One Pilots initially began with conventional live instrumentation, but they found success as part of a group that creates music on laptops. Both musicians are multi-instrumentalists. The duo achieve their sound through singer Tyler Joseph being a pianist, bassist and keyboardist and drummer Josh Dun playing a live drum kit. Other instrumentation used in songs include synthesizers, piano, electronic keyboards, trumpets, electric guitar and occasionally ukulele. Their tracks most prominently integrate programmed beats and keyboards, along with Dun playing drums. This mixture provides the duo with a rock and electropop crossover sound. Despite their chart-topping dominance of rock charts, many of their songs feature no guitar. For most tracks, software replace traditional rock instruments and loops take precedent over riffs. Some listeners tend to question whether Twenty One Pilots constitute as rock, considering the duo generally neglect the use of guitar, although it has started to become a more prominent instrument in their recent work. According to University of Virginia musicologist Karl Hagstrom Miller, Twenty One Pilots is a prime example of how modern bands are evolving from the guitar-bass-drums format, a staple of punk rock, to "other configurations of musical collaboration."

During their songs, Joseph incorporates rapping, singing, screaming, and sometimes crooning. He utilizes a fast-paced style of reciting lyrics that is characteristic of rap music. His rapping voice has a strong emphasis on flow and rhyme schemes, and has been compared to K'naan and Macklemore. While he acknowledges Joseph's style of rapping is often compared to Macklemore, music journalist Carl Wilson opines, "but among the ranks of post-Eminem white rappers, I find Joseph more probing, sardonic, and expressive." However, Joseph doesn't consider himself a rapper. Joseph explains that he never intended to be a rapper, and simply finds the art-form of rap the most effective way of trying to say something with his music. He realized how little the amount of lyrics are in a full song, because they're sung and words are drawn out by melodies. When attempting to write poetry he had written for the lyrics of a song, Joseph found there were "way too many words to fit". He soon found himself just saying the poetry in tempo and realizing that he was rapping. His vocal performance, which sometimes also includes full-throated screaming, coupled with an earnest, patchy way of delivering word play atop Dun's drumming rhythms is part of what allowed the duo to break-out of the alternative scene.

Lyrical themes
Tyler Joseph writes lyrics that are often psychodramatic in nature and usually based around his piano parts. He describes his songwriting as well as himself as "very dramatic." Joseph claims he began writing songs because there were things he wanted to say that he didn't know how to in a normal conversation. He is mostly inspired by chord progression and song structure, and his lyrics come afterwards. Joseph usually composes the music first because he has a studio in his basement. He is able to lay down thoughts musically in terms of chord progression, come up with a melody and then fit the lyrics into that song. Their music inspires song lyrics depending on what is being imparted most of the time. However, Joseph also likes to write poetry so sometimes he musically creates a song and then fits the poetry. Dun's energetic drumming lays down a stable, equally prominent rhythm for Joseph as he shifts between the expressive lyrics of his verses and an almost melodic style of rapping during many of their songs.

Alongside their mixture of musical styles, the band melds relatable rhymes with angsty lyrics. Lyrically, Twenty One Pilots is conventionally post-emo. They coincide with a contemporary wave of emo revival fueled in part by millennial nostalgia for popular music from the early 2000s. Joseph's confessional lines convey personal turmoils and deeply rooted insecurities. Their songs contain moments where personal despair connect to a universal context, often relating to that of faith, location or community. Thus making the band more accessible than other more insular emo-inspired artists. Having been raised in Christian households, the lyrics of their songs rarely engage in profanity and shock value. The duo still identify as Christians, and a significant portion of their fanbase interpret lyrics from their songs as an ongoing negotiation with God. From a more secular perspective, their words center on depression and anxiety, with habitual direct reference to self-harm.

The lyrical themes most prevalent on the band's major-label debut album Vessel were introspection and fear. Joseph wrote from a very introspective perspective, offering an inside view of what he was going through at the time. He feels that music is a catalyst to getting your emotions going. While he acknowledges many who write songs about love do so because its widely believed love is the most powerful emotion there is, he disagrees with the sentiment. Joseph instead thinks the emotion of fear is equally as powerful, if not slightly more so. As a result, much of Vessel pertained to the power of fear as well as dealing with and trying to find hope, peace and redemption at the end of and inside of fear. Their next studio album, Blurryface was much like a concept album in that it was shaped by intimate themes regarding personal issues such as insecurity. Due primarily to the childhood yearnings of their breakout single "Stressed Out", Twenty One Pilots have become emblematic of angst-ridden millennial entitlement. The loose concept album is about Joseph attempting to defeat the alter ego of the titular monster-image representing his insecurities and self-hatred.

Band name, iconography, and fandom
According to the band, their purpose for making music is "to make people think" and encourage them to find joy in what they come to believe in life. Twenty One Pilots derives their band name and philosophy from literary origins. "Bicycle Thief" and "Chill Coat", a play on the last name of the band's lawyer, Jeff Chilcoat, were among some of the rejected band names. This goes back to college days, according to Joseph, when he was studying theater at Ohio State University. He got the band's name and meaning from reading the 1947 play All My Sons by American playwright Arthur Miller. In the story, the main protagonist is a war contractor named Joe Keller who crafts airplane parts for war planes. Upon discovering some are faulty and would fail if used, he must decide whether or not to recall them. Keller is forced to make a decision to either spend his money trying to repair the faulty parts or press forward and use them. Though he wants to do what's right, Keller is afraid to lose money and needs to support his family, so he decides to send the parts anyway, to Europe during World War II. As a consequence of his decision, twenty-one pilots perish. At the end of the play, Keller commits suicide. Joseph explained the story's themes of moral dilemma, between choosing the easy and the right decision resonated with him and inspired the name and formation of the band. While the story is morbid, Joseph discovered a lesson within it. It showed him that every decision he makes will have great outcomes or dire consequences. Joseph stated, "We're constantly faced with decisions. A lot of times, the right ones take more work, it takes longer to see benefit; they're the long route. We know in order to get where we want to be and do what we want to be doing, sometimes we have to do what we don't feel like doing. It takes hard work, and the band name is a constant reminder of that."

The band's name was originally stylized as "twenty | one | pilots" on their earlier cover art; however, by the time of their second album Regional at Best, the formatting was changed to "twenty øne piløts" with a diagonal line through the Os.

Former Twenty One Pilots member Chris Salih stated in an interview that Mark C. Eshleman, a longtime friend of and creative director for Twenty One Pilots, created the band's logo by "messing around with shapes". Joseph found that the arrangement resonated with him. Regarding their logo, Joseph stated in an interview that:

In 2018, a new logo was unveiled for Trenchs release. An extra slash on each side was added to the previous logo. The color scheme was changed to yellow for the shapes with a solid black background, thus coordinating with the color scheme for the album's cover art. Joseph explained that, "If you were to look at those two logos that we had done in the past, and put it together, it would create a logo that is two upward slashes and two sideways slashes. It's kind of a continuation of what we've been working on." He further explained that the extra slashes represent "the feeling of being surrounded by something that's protecting you... I knew I wanted that logo to have those extra layers of protection".

On February 15, 2021, Joseph uploaded an image to his Instagram story, with the 23rd letter of the Greek alphabet, psi, over his right eye. With the release of the lead single for Scaled and Icy, "Shy Away", two months later, this was revealed to be the band's new logo.

The band's fandom has been dubbed as the "Skeleton Clique" or just the Clique, in reference to the band's use of skeleton iconography in many performances, graphics, and music videos. The Skeleton Clique are represented in the band's official iconography by logos of a skull and alien head atop lines resembling keys. In November 2016, during the Blurryface World Tour, the Wood Green tube station in London was decorated in Clique-related artwork, spanning over one-hundred advertising panels. During the 2017 Tour De Columbus, Twenty One Pilots hosted a public art show, dubbed "Artøpia", exclusively for Clique-related artwork at the Nationwide Arena in the United States.

According to Dun, "We played hardcore shows, hip hop shows, no one knew where to put us. But we've approached live shows as a way to build something from nothing." The duo usually perform with pre-recorded keyboard tracks and programmed beats rather than a full band. However, Dun also plays a live drum kit while triggering the pre-recorded backing tracks. A former skater, he often breaks his performance up by using acrobatics, such as backflips. Meanwhile, Tyler Joseph wears masks and occasionally body makeup while rapping and singing. He plays multiple instruments while live wearing a balaclava. During their early shows, Joseph would wear a floral kimono onstage. Dun stated, "We thought it was kind of cool, new and different to wear masks onstage, but yeah, people were confused."

Band members

Current members
 Tyler Joseph – lead vocals, piano, ukulele, guitar, bass, keyboards, programming, percussion (2009–present)
 Josh Dun – drums, percussion, trumpet, backing vocals (2011–present)
Former members
 Chris Salih – drums, percussion, backing vocals (2009–2011)
 Nick Thomas – bass guitar, guitar, keyboards, backing vocals (2009–2011)
Touring members
 Skyler Acord – bass guitar (2021–present)
 Todd Gummerman – keyboards, guitar, backing vocals (2021–present)
 Paul Meany – keyboards, backing vocals, musical director (2021–present)
 Dan Geraghty – guitar (2021–present)
 Jesse Blum – trumpet (2021–present) (other appearances 2014–2020) 
Former touring members
 Kenyon Dixon – backing vocals (2021)
 Danielle Withers – backing vocals (2021)

Timeline

Touring members timeline

Discography

 Twenty One Pilots (2009)
 Regional at Best (2011)
 Vessel (2013)
 Blurryface (2015)
 Trench (2018)
 Scaled and Icy (2021)

Awards and nominations

Concert tours

Headlining
 Regional at Best Tour headlining alongside CHALLENGER! (2011)
 Mostly November Tour (2012)
 Trip for Concerts Spring 2013 (2013)
Trip for Concerts Autumn 2013 (2013)
 Quiet Is Violent Tour (2014)
 Blurryface Tour (2015–2016)
 Emotional Roadshow World Tour (2016–2017)
 The Bandito Tour (2018–2019)
 Takeover Tour (2021–2022)
The Icy Tour (2022)

Opening act
 Nylon Music Tour for Neon Trees, alongside Walk the Moon (2012)
 Save Rock and Roll Tour for Fall Out Boy, alongside Panic! at the Disco (2013)
The Self-Titled Tour for Paramore (2013–2014)

See also
 List of songs recorded by Twenty One Pilots
 List of artists who reached number one on the U.S. alternative rock chart
 List of best-selling singles in the United States
 List of best-selling singles worldwide
 List of most-streamed songs on Spotify
 List of most-streamed artists on Spotify
 List of American Grammy Award winners and nominees
 Global Recording Artist of the Year
 Music of Ohio

References

External links

 
 
 

 
2009 establishments in Ohio
Alternative rock groups from Ohio
American hip hop groups
Indie pop groups from Ohio
American musical duos
Electropop groups
Fueled by Ramen artists
Grammy Award winners
Musical groups established in 2009
Musical groups from Columbus, Ohio
Rock music duos
Rock music groups from Ohio